Lilian Velez-Clímaco (March 3, 1924 – July 26, 1948) was a Filipina film actress and singer. Her 1948 murder by fellow actor Narding Anzures scandalized the post-war Philippines.

Career
Born in Cebu to a composer, Velez first came into the limelight when she won an amateur radio singing contest in the mid-1930s. Prior to the outbreak of World War II, her singing career thrived, and she popularized one of her father's songs, Sa Kabukiran. Velez also won the heart of Jose Climaco, the manager of the radio station which had sponsored the contest which won her fame. They were married in 1942 and had one daughter named Vivian V. Climaco (May 4, 1944 – September 19, 2021).

Her film career began upon the resumption of Filipino film production after the end of the war. She joined Filippine Films, and with her husband as director, starred in such films as Binibiro Lamang Kita, Ang Estudyante, and Sa Kabukiran, inspired by the song that had earlier earned her fame. Her leading man in these films was Narding Anzures, a former child star.

Her last film appearance was when she joined LVN Pictures, after the success of her previous films produced by Filippine Films. She starred in her first and last movie appearance, which is Enkantada with her new leading man, Jaime de la Rosa. It was released in 1958, the same year of her murder.

Selected filmography

Personal life
Velez had three brothers named Theodoro (a popular craftsman), Cecilio and George (or Jose or Joseph) and two sisters named Gloria and Aida.

Murder
After the success of Sa Kabukiran, LVN Pictures decided to cast Jaime de la Rosa as Velez's leading man in her next film. The decision caused distress on the part of Anzures, who had seemingly become obsessed with the married Velez. At 1:00 am of June 26, 1948, Anzures paid an unexpected visit to the Quezon City home of Velez. Upon his arrival, he stabbed Velez to death and a housemaid who had come to her mistress's assistance. The crime was committed within view of Velez's toddler daughter Vivian, who was unharmed during the incident. Anzures was promptly arrested, tried and convicted for the murders. The crime and the subsequent trial was a cause célèbre in Manila. Anzures later died in jail from tuberculosis; his exact motives for the murder were never fully determined. 
She was buried at Manila North Cemetery.

1995 film biography
In 1995, the murder of Lilian Velez was the subject of a high-profile film directed by Carlo J. Caparas. Starring award-winning actress Sharon Cuneta as Velez and Cesar Montano as Anzures, the film was one in a string of "true-crime" films churned out by Caparas in the mid-late 1990s.

References

External links
 
 
 

1924 births
1948 deaths
20th-century Filipino actresses
20th-century Filipino women singers
Deaths by stabbing in the Philippines
Filipino child actresses
Filipino women pop singers
Filipino film actresses
Filipino murder victims
People from Cebu City
Actresses from Cebu
Singers from Cebu City
People from Quezon City
People murdered in the Philippines